The 1990–91 season was Cardiff City F.C.'s 64th season in the Football League when they competed in the 24-team Division Four, then the fourth tier of English football, finishing thirteenth.

Players
First team squad.

Standings

Results by round

Fixtures and results

Fourth Division

Source

League Cup

FA Cup

Welsh Cup

Leyland DAF Cup

See also
List of Cardiff City F.C. seasons

References

Bibliography

Welsh Football Data Archive

Cardiff City F.C. seasons
Cardiff City
Cardiff City